

Wilhelm Dommes (16 April 1907 in Berent District, West Prussia – 23 January 1990 in Hannover) was a German U-boat commander in World War II and recipient of the Knight's Cross of the Iron Cross of Nazi Germany. He was the commander of U-boats in the Indian Ocean, whereby German and Japanese forces fought together in the only time in the war. Dommes was the first commander of the U-boat base, in the former British seaplane base in Penang, where he served as head of the Southeast Asia U-boat region.

Awards
 Wehrmacht Long Service Award 3rd Class (23 January 1937)
 The Return of Sudetenland Commemorative Medal of 1 October 1938 (6 September 1940)
 Iron Cross (1939)
 2nd Class (29 November 1939)
 1st Class (10 February 1942)
 U-boat War Badge (1939) (10 February 1942)
 Medaglia di bronzo al Valore Militare (27 July 1942)
 Medaglia d'Argento al Valor Militare (29 May 1943)
 Knight's Cross of the Iron Cross on 2 December 1942 as Kapitänleutnant and commander of U-431
 War Merit Cross with Swords
 2nd Class (30 January 1945)
 1st Class (20 April 1945)
 U-boat Front Clasp (5 March 1945)

Citations

References

External links

1907 births
1990 deaths
U-boat commanders (Kriegsmarine)
Recipients of the Knight's Cross of the Iron Cross
Recipients of the Bronze Medal of Military Valor
Recipients of the Silver Medal of Military Valor
People from West Prussia
People from Kościerzyna County
Reichsmarine personnel
Military history of Malaya during World War II